Mount Powell is a prominent mountain (2,195 m) sharing a small massif with King Peak which stands 1.5 nautical miles (2.8 km) west-northwest, in the east part of the Thiel Mountains in Ellsworth Land, Antarctica.

History 
The name was proposed by Peter Bermel and Arthur Ford, co-leaders of the Thiel Mountains party which surveyed these mountains in 1960–61. Named for John Wesley Powell, second director of the U.S. Geological Survey, 1881–94. Other peaks in the vicinity are named for directors of the United States Geological Survey (USGS).

See also
 Mountains in Antarctica

References

Powell, Mount
Two-thousanders of Antarctica